Fanalysis is a 2002 short documentary film directed by Bruce Campbell and starring Campbell, Ted Raimi, and Harry Knowles.

Overview
Actor Bruce Campbell investigates the world of fans of cult movies and television.

Starring
Bruce Campbell as himself
Ted Raimi as himself
Tim Thomerson as himself
Ryan Wickerham as himself
Harry Knowles as himself

References

External links 

2002 films
American documentary films
2002 documentary films
Documentary films about fandom
Documentary films about films
Films directed by Bruce Campbell
2000s English-language films
2000s American films